Sonama rural municipality  is a Rural municipality in Mahottari District in the Janakpur Zone of south-eastern Nepal. At the time of the 1991 Nepal census it had a population of 7016 people living in 1315 individual households. Now according to 2021its population in 51732

References

External links
UN map of the municipalities of Mahottari District

Populated places in Mahottari District